is a Japanese professional shogi player, ranked 9-dan. He is a former Ryūō title holder, and a former non-executive director of the Japan Shogi Association.

Fujii is known for developing the Fujii System, a class of strategies for Fourth File Rook positions against Static Rook opponents especially Static Rook Anaguma.

Shogi professional
Fujii's first tournament championship as a professional came in 1996 when he defeated Tadahisa Maruyama 2 games to 1 to win the 27th  tournament. The following year, Fujii defended his championship by defeating Mamoru Hatakeyama 2 games to none to win the 28th Shinjin-Ō tournament. Fujii won the tournament for a third time in 1999 when he defeated Kazushiza Horiguchi 2 games to none to win the 30th Shinjin-Ō tournament. Fujii is one of three professionals to win the Shinjin-Ō tournament three times.

Fujii's first appearance in a major title match came in 1998 when he challenged Kōji Tanigawa for the 11th Ryūō title. Fujii earned the right to challenge Tanigawa by winning Class 4 in the tournament's preliminary rounds and then advancing to the finals of the challenger's tournament where he defeated Yoshiharu Habu 2 games to 1. In the title match against Tanigawa, Fujii won the first four games to sweep the match 4 game to none and win his first major title. Fujii successfully defended his title the next two years when he defeated Daisuke Suzuki 4 games to 1 (12th Ryūō title match) in 1999 and Habu 4 games to 3 (13th Ryūō title match) in 2000, Fujii's victory of Habu made him the first person to win the Ryuo title three years in a row. Fujii, however, was unable to defend his title a third consecutive time when he lost to Habu 4 games to 1 in the 14th Ryūō title match in 2001.

Fujii also challenged Habu for the 48th and 58th Ōza titles in 2000 and 2010 respectively as well as for the 53rd Ōi title in 2012, but lost each time: 48th Ōza (2002) 3 games to 2; 58th Ōza (2010) 3 games to none; and 53rd Ōi (2012) 4 games to 1.

Fujii became the 49th professional to win his 600th official game when he defeated Tetsurō Itodani on January 27, 2016.

Promotion history
Fujii's promotion history is as follows:
 6-kyū: April 1986
 1-dan: October 1988
 4-dan: April 1, 1991
 5-dan: April 1, 1994
 6-dan: April 1, 1995
 7-dan: October 1, 1998
 8-dan: October 1, 1999
 9-dan: October 1, 2000

Titles and other championships
Fujii has appeared in major title matches seven times and has won three titles. He won the 11th (1998), 12th (1999) and 13th (2000) Ryūō titles. In addition to major titles, Fujii has won eight non-major-title championships during his career.

Major titles

Other championships

Note: Tournaments marked with an asterisk (*) are no longer held.

Awards and honors
Fujii has received a number of awards and honors throughout his career for his accomplishments both on an off the shogi board. These include the Annual Shogi Awards given out by the JSA for performance in official games as well as other JSA awards for career accomplishments, and awards received from governmental organizations, etc. for contributions made to Japanese society.

Annual Shogi Awards
24th Annual Awards (April 1996March 1997): Masuda Award
26th Annual Awards (April 1998March 1999): Most Games Won, Most Games Played, Technique Award
27th Annual Awards (April 1999March 2000): Distinguished Service Award
28th Annual Awards (April 2000March 2001): Technique Award
38th Annual Awards (April 2010March 2011): Game of the Year Special Prize
40th Annual Awards (April 2012March 2013): Masuda Award

Other awards
1999, January: Numata City  Meritorius Citizen Award
2016, January: Shogi Honor Award (Awarded by the JSA in recognition of winning 600 official games as a professional)
2016:  25 Years Service Award (Awarded by the JSA in recognition of being an active professional for twenty-five years)

Year-end shogi prize money and game fee ranking
Fujii has finished in the "Top 10" of the JSA's  nine times since 1993, and in the "Top 3" twice.

Note: All amounts are given in Japanese yen and include prize money and fees earned from official tournaments and games held from January 1 to December 31.

JSA director
Fujii was selected to Japan Shogi Association's board of directors as a non-executive director at association's 63rd General Meeting in June 2012. He served in that capacity until June 2014.

Notes

References

External links
ShogiHub: Professional Player Info · Fujii, Takeshi
Lectures on the Latest Strategies: 
Lecture 3: White's Fujii System
Lecture 4: Black's Fujii System
Appendix: Basic procedure of Fujii system
fujii-system.com 

1970 births
Japanese shogi players
Living people
Professional shogi players
Professional shogi players from Gunma Prefecture
Ryūō
Recipients of the Kōzō Masuda Award
Shinjin-Ō
Ginga